Julie Ruin is the independent solo debut album by Kathleen Hanna under the name Julie Ruin in 1997, recorded while taking a break from Bikini Kill. Hanna recalled:

She cited two albums, Girl Talk by Lesley Gore and Delete Yourself by Atari Teenage Riot, among the inspirations for hers. In addition to feminism, it touches upon crocheting, aerobics and resisting police abuse. It was mostly produced in Hanna's apartment in Olympia, Washington. She declared:

Hanna started collaborating with her friends Sadie Benning and Johanna Fateman to create a live band to perform songs from the album. This group would go on to become Le Tigre.

In December 2010, Hanna and former Bikini Kill bandmate Kathi Wilcox formed a band called The Julie Ruin.

Track listing

Samples

I Wanna Know What Love Is samples The Guns of Brixton by The Clash.
Stay Monkey samples I'm Coolin', No Foolin''' by Lesley Gore.Breakout A-Town samples It's All I Can Do by The Cars.Love Letter samples I'm So Bored with the USA'' by The Clash.

References

1997 debut albums
Kill Rock Stars albums
Kathleen Hanna albums
Electronic albums by American artists
Riot grrrl albums
Lo-fi music albums
Hip hop albums by American artists